The canton of Aspres-sur-Buëch is a former administrative division in southeastern France. It was disbanded following the French canton reorganisation which came into effect in March 2015. It consisted of 8 communes, which joined the canton of Serres in 2015. It had 1,976 inhabitants (2012).

The canton comprised the following communes:

Aspremont
Aspres-sur-Buëch
La Beaume
La Faurie
La Haute-Beaume
Montbrand
Saint-Julien-en-Beauchêne
Saint-Pierre-d'Argençon

Demographics

See also
Cantons of the Hautes-Alpes department

References

Former cantons of Hautes-Alpes
2015 disestablishments in France
States and territories disestablished in 2015